Kholifa Mabang Chiefdom is a chiefdom in Tonkolili District of Sierra Leone. Its capital is Mabang, Sierra Leone.

References 

Chiefdoms of Sierra Leone
Northern Province, Sierra Leone